Zovaber (also, Yaydzhi, Yaudzhi, and Yayji) is a town in the Syunik Province of Armenia.

References 
 

Populated places in Syunik Province